Woman in White (Swedish: Kvinna i vitt) is a 1949 Swedish drama film directed by Arne Mattsson and starring Margareta Fahlén, Georg Løkkeberg and Eva Dahlbeck. It was shot at the Råsunda Studios in Stockholm and on location in the city. The film's sets were designed by the art director Nils Svenwall. It is unconnected with the Wilkie Collins novel The Woman in White.

Synopsis
Doctor Karin Lange arrives at a hospital to begin work but faces opposition from the head of surgery who believes women are not suited to the medical profession.

Cast
 Margareta Fahlén as Dr. Karin Lange
 Georg Løkkeberg as Prof. Borenius 
 Eva Dahlbeck as 	Solveig Rygård
 Karl-Arne Holmsten as Dr. Jan Lindquist
 Holger Löwenadler as 	Dr. Bo Wallgren
 Sigge Fürst as Boman
 Barbro Nordin as 	Nurse Aina
 Julia Cæsar as Clara Clarin
 Artur Rolén as Hampling
 John Melin as Algotson
 Marianne Löfgren as Mrs. Blom
 Ludde Juberg as Alfred Blom
 Mimi Nelson as Olga Lindberg
 Aurore Palmgren as Miss Andersson
 Georg Skarstedt as Alm
 Magnus Kesster as Dr. Åhman 
 Saga Sjöberg as Lilli Wallgren
 Monica Weinzierl as Barbro

References

Bibliography 
 Qvist, Per Olov & von Bagh, Peter. Guide to the Cinema of Sweden and Finland. Greenwood Publishing Group, 2000.

External links 
 
 

1949 films
Swedish drama films
1949 drama films
1940s Swedish-language films
Films directed by Arne Mattsson
Swedish black-and-white films
Films based on Austrian novels
1940s Swedish films